Asby is a village in Cumbria, England, historically part of Cumberland, near the Lake District National Park.

Location

Governance
Asby is within the Copeland UK Parliamentary constituency and the North West England European Parliamentary constituency. Trudy Harrison is the Member of parliament.

For the European Parliament residents in Asby voted to elect MEP's for the North West England constituency, before Brexit in 2020.

For Local Government purposes it is in the Arlecdon + Ennerdale ward of the Borough of Copeland and the Cleator Moor East + Frizington ward of Cumbria County Council.

Asby has its own Parish Council; Arlecdon & Frizington Parish Council, the civil parish of Arlecdon and Frizington, has a population of 3,678,

References

Villages in Cumbria
Borough of Copeland